John Gregory Morrisett is the Jack and Rilla Neafsey Dean and Vice Provost of Cornell Tech. He previously was Dean of the Faculty of Computing and Information Science at Cornell University. Morrisett was the Allen B. Cutting Professor of Computer Science in the Harvard School of Engineering and Applied Sciences prior to his position at Cornell.

His group at Cornell University created the Cyclone programming language.

His current research interests are in the applications of programming language technology for building secure and reliable systems. In particular, he is interested in applications of advanced type systems, model checkers, certifying compilers, proof-carrying code, and inlined reference monitors for building efficient and provably secure systems.  He is also interested in the design and application of high-level languages for new or emerging domains, such as sensor networks.

He received his PhD under Jeannette Wing and Robert Harper at Carnegie Mellon University in 1995.

In 2013 he became a Fellow of the Association for Computing Machinery.

References

External links
 Home page

American computer scientists
Programming language researchers
Cornell University faculty
Carnegie Mellon University alumni
Fellows of the Association for Computing Machinery
Living people
Year of birth missing (living people)
John A. Paulson School of Engineering and Applied Sciences faculty